is a former international table tennis player from Japan.

He won a silver medal at the 1965 World Table Tennis Championships in the Swaythling Cup (men's team event) with Koji Kimura, Ken Konaka, Ichiro Ogimura and Hiroshi Takahashi.

See also
 List of table tennis players
 List of World Table Tennis Championships medalists

References

Japanese male table tennis players
World Table Tennis Championships medalists